Eunaticina is a genus of predatory sea snails, marine gastropod mollusks in the subfamily Sininae  of the  family Naticidae, the moon snails.

Species
Species within the genus Eunaticina include:
 Eunaticina africana Fernandes & Burnay
 Eunaticina albosutura Verco, 1909
 † Eunaticina auriformis (Marwick, 1924) 
 Eunaticina emmeles (Melvill, 1910)
 † Eunaticina fornicata (Suter, 1917) 
 Eunaticina heimi Jordan & Hertlein, 1934
 Eunaticina inflata (Tesch, 1920)
 Eunaticina kraussi (E. A. Smith, 1902)
 Eunaticina linnaeana (Récluz, 1843)
 Eunaticina margaritaeformis Dall, 1924
 Eunaticina mienisi 
 Eunaticina oblonga Reeve, 1864
 Eunaticina papilla (Gmelin, 1791)
 Eunaticina umbilicata (Quoy & Gaimard, 1833)
Species brought into synonymy
 † Eunaticina abyssalis Simone, 2014: synonym of † Janthina typica (Bronn, 1861) 
 Eunaticina cincta (Hutton, 1885): synonym of Eunaticina papilla (Gmelin, 1791)
 Eunaticina coarctata (Reeve, 1864): synonym of Eunaticina papilla (Gmelin, 1791)
 Eunaticina intercisum (Iredale, 1931): synonym of Gennaeosinum intercisum Iredale, 1931
 Eunaticina lamarckiana (Récluz, 1843): synonym of Eunaticina papilla lamarckiana  (Récluz, 1843)
 Eunaticina mienisi Kilburn, 1988: synonym of Sigatica mienisi (Kilburn, 1988) (original combination)
 Eunaticina parvula Bozzetti, 2019: synonym of Vanikoro parvula (Bozzetti, 2019) (original combination)
 Eunaticina peleum (Iredale, 1929): synonym of Gennaeosinum peleum Iredale, 1929
 Eunaticina perobliqua (Dautzenberg and Fischer, 1906): synonym of Gennaeosinum perobliquum (Dautzenberg & Fischer, 1906)
 Eunaticina pomatiella Melvill, 1892: synonym of Sigatica pomatiella (Melvill, 1893)

References

 Beu A.G. (2004) Marine Mollusca of oxygen isotope stages of the last 2 million years in New Zealand. Part 1: Revised generic positions and recognition of warm-water and cool-water migrants. Journal of the Royal Society of New Zealand 34(2): 111-265. page(s): 206
 Torigoe K. & Inaba A. (2011). Revision on the classification of Recent Naticidae. Bulletin of the Nishinomiya Shell Museum. 7: 133 + 15 pp., 4 pls

External links
 Fischer P. (1880-1887). Manuel de Conchyliologie et de Paléontologie Conchyliologique. Paris, Savy pp. XXIV + 1369 + pl. 23. 

Naticidae